Miss USA 2007 was the 56th Miss USA pageant, held at Dolby Theatre in Los Angeles, California on March 23, 2007, after two weeks of events and preliminary competition.  The winner of the pageant was Rachel Smith of Tennessee.

The pageant was broadcast live on NBC from the Kodak Theatre in Los Angeles, California one month earlier than the 2006 pageant.  This was the second time that the pageant was held at this venue; it was previously held there in 2004, when Shandi Finnessey of Missouri was crowned Miss USA 2004. The host hotel was the Wilshire Grand.

Delegates arrived in Los Angeles on March 8, 2007, and were involved in two weeks of rehearsals and events prior to the final show.  The preliminary competition were held on March 19, 2007, where all 51 contestants competed in swimsuit and evening gown, with the personal interview competition being held in private the previous day. This was the first time in recent years that the presentation show was held in the hotel ballroom, rather than at the location of the final competition.

During the final show on March 23, the fifteen delegates with the highest average score from the preliminary competition were announced. The top fifteen competed in the swimsuit competition, and the top ten competed in evening gown. The composite score was shown after each round of competition for the first time since 2002.

At the conclusion of the final night of competition, outgoing titleholder Tara Conner crowned Rachel Smith of Tennessee as the new Miss USA.  Smith was the third consecutive former Miss Teen USA delegate to win the title and the second woman from Tennessee. Coincidentally, both Smith and Conner had competed together at Miss Teen USA 2002.

Results

Placements

Special awards

Final competition

 Winner 
 First Runner-Up
 Second Runner-Up 
 Third Runner-Up
 Fourth Runner-Up
 Top 10
 Top 15

Nevada's evening gown score was not shown, but must be greater than 8.437.

Historical significance 
 Tennessee wins competition for the second time.
 Rhode Island earns the 1st runner-up position for the first time and surpasses its previous highest placement from 1973.
 Kansas earns the 2nd runner-up position for the second time. The last time it placed this was in 1993.
 California earns the 3rd runner-up position for the sixth time. The last time it placed this was in 1981.
 Nevada earns the 4th runner-up position for the second time. The last time it placed this was in 1962. Also it was reached its highest placement since 1977.
 States that placed in semifinals the previous year were California, Nevada, Rhode Island, South Carolina, Tennessee and Texas.
 Texas placed for the seventh consecutive year.
 California placed for the third consecutive year. 
 Nevada, Rhode Island, South Carolina and Tennessee made their second consecutive placement.
 Michigan, North Carolina and Utah last placed in 2005.
 Missouri last placed in 2004.
 Hawaii last placed in 2003.
 Kansas and Louisiana last placed in 2002.
 Virginia last placed in 1999.
 Wisconsin last placed in 1979.
 Illinois and Kentucky breaks an ongoing streak of placements since 2005.
 Florida breaks an ongoing streak of placements since 2004.

Selection of contestants
One delegate from each state was chosen in state pageants held from June to December 2006.  The first state pageant was Texas, held on June 25, 2006, and the final pageants were Kansas and Hawaii, held on December 17, 2006.

Two contestants were replaced by their first runners-up:
Helen Salas was awarded the Miss Nevada USA 2007 title on December 21, 2006, when the original winner, Katie Rees, was dethroned after the publication of racy photographs. Salas was originally the first runner-up to Ms. Rees in the Miss Nevada USA 2007 pageant which had taken place on October 8, 2006.
Erin Abrahamson was awarded the Miss New Jersey USA 2007 title on January 15, 2007, when the original winner, Ashley Harder, resigned due to pregnancy. Pageant rules prohibit titleholders from competing while pregnant. Abrahamson was originally the first runner-up to Harder in the New Jersey pageant.

For the first time in the history of the pageant, eleven former Miss Teen USA delegates competed in the pageant.  Initially only nine held titles, but the number increased to eleven after two titleholders resigned and former Teen USA delegates succeeded them.

Delegates
The Miss USA 2007 delegates are:

 Alabama - Rebecca Moore
 Alaska - Blair Chenoweth
 Arizona - Courtney Barnas
 Arkansas - Kelly George
 California - Meagan Tandy
 Colorado - Keena Bonella
 Connecticut - Melanie Mudry
 Delaware - Nicole Bosso
 District of Columbia - Mercedes Lindsay
 Florida - Jenna Edwards
 Georgia - Brittany Swann
 Hawaii - Chanel Wise
 Idaho - Amanda Rammell
 Illinois - Mia Heaston
 Indiana - Jami Stallings
 Iowa - Dani Reeves
 Kansas - Cara Gorges
 Kentucky - Michelle Banzer
 Louisiana - Elizabeth McNulty
 Maine - Erin Good
 Maryland - Michaé Holloman
 Massachusetts - Despina Delios
 Michigan - Kelly Best
 Minnesota - Alla Ilushka
 Mississippi - Jalin Wood
 Missouri - Amber Seyer
 Montana - Stephanie Trudeau
 Nebraska - Geneice Wilcher
 Nevada - Helen Salas
 New Hampshire - Laura Silva
 New Jersey - Erin Abrahamson
 New Mexico - Casey Messer
 New York - Gloria Almonte
 North Carolina - Erin O'Kelley
 North Dakota - Rachel Mathson
 Ohio - Anna Melomud
 Oklahoma - Caitlin Simmons
 Oregon - Sharitha McKenzie
 Pennsylvania - Samantha Johnson
 Rhode Island - Danielle Lacourse
 South Carolina - Ashley Zais
 South Dakota - Suzie Heffernan
 Tennessee - Rachel Smith
 Texas - Magen Ellis
 Utah - Heather Anderson
 Vermont - Jessica Comolli
 Virginia - Lauren Barnette
 Washington - LeiLani Jones
 West Virginia - Kasey Montgomery
 Wisconsin - Caitlin Morrall
 Wyoming - Robyn Johnson

Judges
Jonathan Antin - Bravo's Blow Out star
Dr. Jerry Buss - Los Angeles Lakers owner, real estate tycoon 
Giuliana Rancic - E! News Co–Host  
Vanessa Minnillo - Miss Teen USA 1998 from South Carolina
Kimora Lee Simmons - President and Creative Director of Baby Phat 
Jerry Springer - host of NBC show America's Got Talent and host of his own talk show The Jerry Springer Show
Vince Young - Tennessee Titans quarterback
Corinne Nicolas - President of  Trump Model Management

Hosts
Nancy O'Dell - Access Hollywood Correspondent
Tim Vincent - Access Hollywood Correspondent

See also
Miss USA 2006
Miss Teen USA 2007
Miss Universe 2007

References

External links
Miss USA official website 

2007
March 2007 events in the United States
2007 beauty pageants
2007 in California